Erica azorica (Portuguese: urze) is a species of heath endemic to the Azores.

Distribution
Erica azorica is mainly distributed on coastal cliffs, lava flows, dry slopes, in natural forests, Australian cheesewood woodlands, ravines and craters of the Azorean archipelago, from sea level to the highest altitudes.

References

azorica
Endemic flora of the Azores